Grażyna Brodzińska née Wayda (b. May 5, 1951 in Cracow) is a Polish soprano, opera and operetta singer, and musical actress, nicknamed The First Lady of Polish Operetta.

 Biography 
Brodzińska was born on May 5, 1951, in Cracow, the daughter of director Edmund Wayda and opera singer Irena Brodzińska. In 1960s she graduated from Danuta Baduszkowa's Actors Studio in Gdynia.

Grażyna Brodzińska performed at Musical Theatre in Gdynia (1969–1976) and later at Musical Theatre in Szczecin, Warsaw Operetta and Roma Theatre in Warsaw. Since 2002 Brodzińska is an actress of Silesian Operetta in Gliwice.

 Discography 
 2008 Sway – Kołysz mnie 2002 Śpiewaj, kochaj 1999 Najpiękniejsze kolędy 1998 Pardon Madame 1997 Jestem zakochana – 12 najpiękniejszych arii operetkowych''

References

External links

 Official website

1951 births
Living people
20th-century Polish actresses
Ballad musicians
Polish sopranos
Polish musical theatre actresses
Musicians from Kraków
Actresses from Kraków
Polish women singers